The extent of water scarcity in Mexico is so serious that the government released an advertising campaign titled "February 2010: The City May Run Out of Water". 

Mexico City's hydrological paradox is that (unlike Los Angeles) it gets more than enough rain to, in theory, keep the 21 million people who live in and around it adequately supplied with water. Its average annual precipitation is about twice that of Los Angeles, and even exceeds that of famously damp London. But most of the rainfall (or hail) comes during the summer, and often during just a few epic storms. So when it is wet, it is much too wet, and the city has built a massive infrastructure over the past five centuries to get the water out quickly. To keep hydrated during the drier months, Mexico City imports water from other regions but mainly just pumps from underground, which causes land subsidence, which makes flooding worse.

Currently in Mexico, agriculture accounts for 77% of water use, industry 10% and domestic uses 13%. As a consequence of the 1980 economic crisis, the Mexican irrigation infrastructure became a victim of underinvestment and neglect. Of the 82 irrigation districts present, 42 are in a state of slow deterioration, exacerbating an inefficient usage of water. Furthermore, in a water-saving tax Tarifa 09, the biggest users of water by far - the farmers, were actually exempted.

With an increasing population, and considerable economic activities, the Mexican residents of semi-arid and arid north, northwest and central regions use on average  of water a day, compared to their US counterparts who use only . These regions also account for 84% of Mexico's GDP, have 77% of the population, but have only 28% of runoff water supply. Such high demand factors coupled with low water supplies, means water scarcity is particular evident and serious in these regions. 

Mexico is also heavily dependent on underground aquifers, as it continues to draw water from these sources to supply almost 70% of its needs. However, the rate of extraction has far exceeded replenishment. As of 2010, 101 of the 653 aquifers in Mexico are severely exploited, all of which are located in the water-scarce regions. Continual draining of water from such aquifers has resulted in the city plunging some 10 meters in the 20th century, clearly indicating that other alternatives are required to sustain the water supply of Mexico. 

An alternative is the tapping of water from the Cutzamala dam system. Huge pipes that used to expel wastewater to prevent flooding are now being used to pipe water into the city from the dam system. Water is transported across a total distance of 180 kilometers and almost 1000 meters in altitude to reach water-scarce states. However, this presents no viable long-term solution either, as the dam system itself is drying up. Enduring the worst drought in 70 years, the Cutzamala basin is only at 47% of its capacity. Yet its water level continues to fall rapidly. Providing a fifth of Mexico's water, the poor infrastructural state of the aged system underscores a loss of 40% or 6000 litres of water every second before reaching Mexico. Repair projects requiring M70 million have since been shelved, contributing to the standstill in efforts to solve Mexico's water scarcity problem.

See also

 Water resources in Mexico 
 Water supply and sanitation in Mexico

References

Scarcity
Mexico